Flowers is an unincorporated community in Johnston County, North Carolina, United States, west of Jordan, northeast of Clayton, and southeast of Archer Lodge. It lies at an elevation of 289 feet (88 m).

It is named for famed bootlegger and land owner Percy Flowers, who owned much of the property in the area.

While the borders of the community are not well defined, the intersection of Buffalo Road and North Carolina Highway 42, known as "Flowers Crossroads", is generally considered the center of the community. Flowers Plantation is a large housing development in the unincorporated community, that was voted 2013 and 2014 NC Community of the Year by the North Carolina Home Builders Association.  The Flowers General Store is the main landmark at the center of the community.

References 

Unincorporated communities in Johnston County, North Carolina
Unincorporated communities in North Carolina